Vineyard Creek, a northern tributary of the Parramatta River, is a creek in Sydney, Australia.

History and ecology
The creek takes its name from the fourth land grant in the colony of New South Wales which was made to Phillip Schaeffer. Schaeffer created a property called 'The Vineyard'. After a succession of owners the property was purchased by Hannibal Macarthur in 1813.  Macarthur built a mansion called 'The Vineyard' on the land in 1836.

The source of the creek is Elizabeth Macarthur Park, Oatlands, where it flows south through Dundas, before reaching the mouth of the Parramatta River at Rydalmere.

The catchment is predominantly urban, comprising residential, commercial and industrial developments. In its upper reaches, the catchment is steeply graded with narrow valleys spilling out to a wider floodplain downstream of Victoria Road. Vineyard Creek enters the Parramatta River from the north and to the east of the Rydalmere campus of the University of Western Sydney.

See also

 Subiaco Creek
 List of rivers of New South Wales (L-Z)

References

Creeks and canals of Sydney
Parramatta River
Parramatta